Kailashtilla Gas Field is a natural gas field at Sylhet, Bangladesh. It was discovered in 1962 by Pakistan Shell Oil Company. It starts producing gas since 1983. It is controlled by Sylhet Gas Fields Limited. This gas field is situated nearly 35 km away from Beanibazar Gas Field. In 2012, conducting a 3D seismic surveys, Bapex found oil reserves of nearly 137 million barrels in Kailashtilla and Haripur; of which 109 million barrels of oil reserve at Kailashtilla and the remaining of 28 million barrels in Haripur. Oil was first discovered in Haripur field in the 1980s. According to the BAPEX, the oil found in Kailashtila field is lighter and easily extractable, then that in Haripur.

See also 

List of natural gas fields in Bangladesh
Bangladesh Gas Fields Company Limited
Gas Transmission Company Limited

References 

1962 establishments in Asia
Economy of Sylhet
Natural gas fields in Bangladesh